Edinburgh West was a constituency of the Scottish Parliament (Holyrood) from 1999 until 2011. It elected one Member of the Scottish Parliament (MSP) by the plurality (first past the post) method of election. It was also one of nine constituencies in the Lothians electoral region, which elected seven additional members, in addition to nine constituency MSPs, to produce a form of proportional representation for the region as a whole.

From the Scottish Parliament election, 2011, the Edinburgh West constituency was re-drawn and renamed Edinburgh Western.

Electoral region 

The other eight constituencies of the Lothians region were Edinburgh Central, Edinburgh East and Musselburgh, Edinburgh North and Leith, Edinburgh Pentlands, Edinburgh South, Linlithgow, Livingston and Midlothian.

The region covered the City of Edinburgh council area, the West Lothian council area, part of the Midlothian council area, and part of the East Lothian council area.

Constituency boundaries and council area 

The Edinburgh West constituency was created at the same time as the Scottish Parliament, in 1999, with the name and boundaries of an  existing Westminster constituency. In 2005, however, Scottish Westminster (House of Commons) constituencies were mostly replaced with new constituencies.

The Holyrood constituency covered a western portion of the City of Edinburgh council area. The rest of the city area was covered by five other constituencies, all also in the Lothians electoral region: Edinburgh North and Leith, Edinburgh Central, Edinburgh Pentlands, Edinburgh East and Musselburgh and Edinburgh South,

Edinburgh West had boundaries with the Edinburgh North and Leith constituency, the Edinburgh Central constituency, and the Edinburgh Pentlands constituency.

Edinburgh East and Musselburgh also covered the Musselburgh portion of the East Lothian council area. The rest of the East Lothian area was covered by the East Lothian constituency, which is in the South of Scotland electoral region.

Wards 

Edinburgh West included the wards of Cramond, Dalmeny and Kirkliston, Davidson's Mains, East Craigs, Gyle, Muirhouse and Drylaw, Murrayfield, North East Corstorphine, South Queensferry, South East Corstorphine, and Stenhouse, part of the Craigleith ward, which is split with Edinburgh Central, and part of the Pilton ward, which was split with Edinburgh North and Leith. The wards were created in 1999, at the same time as the constituency, and are due to be replaced with new wards in 2007, without change to constituency boundaries.

From the 2011 election, Edinburgh West was redrawn and renamed "Edinburgh Western". The electoral wards used in this seat are;

In full: Almond, Drum Brae/Gyle
In part: Forth, Inverleith, Corstorphine/Murrayfield

Constituency profile 

Edinburgh West was mostly suburban, but took in rural areas to the west. It included Cramond, Davidson's Mains, East Craigs, Gyle, Murrayfield, Ratho, South Queensferry, a part of the Craigleith area and a part of the Pilton area.

Members of the Scottish Parliament

Election results

See also 
 Politics of Edinburgh

References 

Scottish Parliament constituencies and regions 1999–2011
Constituencies in Edinburgh
1999 establishments in Scotland
Constituencies established in 1999
2011 disestablishments in Scotland
Constituencies disestablished in 2011
South Queensferry